Hafizur Rahman Pramanik is a Jatiya Party (Ershad) politician and the former Member of Parliament of Gaibandha-1.

Career
Pramanik was elected to parliament from Gaibandha-1 as a Jatiya Party candidate in 1986, 1988, and 1991.

References

Jatiya Party politicians
Living people
3rd Jatiya Sangsad members
4th Jatiya Sangsad members
Year of birth missing (living people)